Tamanka siitensis is a species of fish in the goby family, Gobiidae, and the only member of the monotypic genus Tamanka. It is endemic to Jolo Island in the Sulu Archipelago of the Philippines. It is a freshwater fish that can be found in lakes near the coast. This species grows to a length of  SL.

References

Gobionellinae
Monotypic fish genera
Endemic fauna of the Philippines
Fauna of Sulu
Taxonomy articles created by Polbot
Fish described in 1927